The 2020 Tuscan Grand Prix (officially known as the Formula 1 Pirelli Gran Premio della Toscana Ferrari 1000 2020) was a Formula One motor race held on 13 September 2020 at the Autodromo Internazionale del Mugello in Scarperia e San Piero, Tuscany, Italy. The race was the ninth round of the 2020 Formula One World Championship and the first race of the season with spectators. As of 2023, this is the only Tuscan Grand Prix to be held.

The race was won by Lewis Hamilton of the Mercedes team, with teammate Valtteri Bottas in second; Mercedes scored their third 1–2 finish of the season. Alexander Albon of Red Bull Racing-Honda scored his first podium in Formula One with a third-place finish, becoming the first Thai driver to do so. Albon also become the first Asian driver outside Japan to achieve a podium finish.

The race was the first since the 2016 Brazilian Grand Prix to have two red flags. Due to the two stoppages, the race had three standing starts.

Background 
The race was held as an event celebrating Ferrari's 1000th race in the Formula One World Championship and the safety car used a red livery, instead of its usual silver colour, to mark the occasion. The Mugello Circuit hosted a World Championship Formula One race for the first time. The Ferrari SF1000 sported a special livery: instead of the traditional rosso corsa, the car was painted dark burgundy. Both Sebastian Vettel and Charles Leclerc wore special racing overalls, and both had special helmet designs.

Impact of the COVID-19 pandemic

The  championship was heavily affected by the COVID-19 pandemic. Most of the originally scheduled Grands Prix were cancelled or postponed, prompting the Fédération Internationale de l'Automobile to draft a new calendar. While the previous eight events were held behind closed doors, organizers announced that up to 2,880 spectators would be allowed for the Tuscan Grand Prix.

Entrants

Ten teams (each representing a different constructor) each entered two drivers. The drivers and teams were the same as those on the season entry list with no additional stand-in drivers for either the race or practice.

Tyres 

Sole Formula One tyre manufacturer Pirelli brought the C1, C2, and C3 compound tyres for teams to use in the race, the three hardest compounds available.

Qualifying

Qualifying classification 

  – Sergio Pérez received a one-place grid penalty for causing a collision with Kimi Räikkönen during the second practice session.
  – Daniil Kvyat and Kimi Räikkönen set identical times in Q2; Kvyat was classified ahead as he set his lap time before Räikkönen.

Race 
The race was marked by several incidents. On the first lap at turn 2, Max Verstappen, Pierre Gasly, Kimi Räikkönen, and Romain Grosjean collided, resulting in Gasly and Verstappen retiring from the race and Räikkönen having to change his front wing. Verstappen's car was beached in the gravel trap. A separate incident at the same corner involved Carlos Sainz Jr. and Lance Stroll, as Sainz spun round and damaged Sebastian Vettel's front wing. These incidents together brought out the safety car. On lap 6 the safety car pulled in, but an accordion effect led the midfield drivers to accelerate up to racing speed before the leaders did and were forced to brake, triggering a collision involving Sainz, Kevin Magnussen, Antonio Giovinazzi, and Nicholas Latifi. Grosjean blamed the leader, Valtteri Bottas, for causing the accordion effect, and stated "this is the worst thing I've seen ever." All four drivers retired from the race and the red flag was brought out. During the red flag period, Esteban Ocon retired due to a brake failure; George Russell had earlier reported Ocon's brakes being on fire. The second red flag came on lap 45, after Stroll suffered a tyre failure at lap 43 turn 9, and went into the barrier. His Racing Point RP20 caught on fire, making it harder for the marshalls to clear the track.

Lewis Hamilton won the race, his 90th career win. Valtteri Bottas came in second and Alex Albon finished third; his first career podium. By finishing in ninth place, Kimi Räikkönen scored his first points of the season. A poor restart after the second red flag meant George Russell slipped from ninth to 12th and last. He eventually finished 11th leaving him out of the points. Twelve drivers were warned by the FIA for their part in the accident at the restart on lap 6. Writing for the BBC, former GP2 Series champion Jolyon Palmer praised the circuit, saying that it "defied all the [Hermann] Tilke design theories and yet provided a great spectacle in the traditional sense."

Race classification 

Notes
  – Includes one point for fastest lap.
  – Kimi Räikkönen finished eighth on the track, but received a five-second time penalty for crossing the pit entry line.

Championship standings after the race

Drivers' Championship standings

Constructors' Championship standings

 Note: Only the top five positions are included for both sets of standings.

See also 
 2020 Mugello Formula 2 round
 2020 Mugello Formula 3 round

Notes

References

External links

Tuscan
Tuscan Grand Prix
Tuscan Grand Prix